William Beecher may refer to:

William Beecher (died 1640), MP for Huntingdon
William Beecher (died 1651) (1580–1651), English MP for Dover
Sir William Beecher (died 1694) (1628–1694), English MP for Bedford
William Henry Beecher (1802–1889), dyspeptic minister called "The Unlucky"
William M. Beecher (born 1933), American journalist